The World of Apples is the sixth collection of short fiction by author John Cheever, published in 1973 by Alfred A. Knopf.  The ten stories originally appeared individually in The New Yorker, Esquire, The Saturday Evening Post or Playboy.

The publication of The World of Apples coincided with Cheever's nomination to the American Academy of Arts and Letters.

Stories
The original date of publication and name of the journal appear in parenthesis.: 
"The Chimera" (The New Yorker, July 4, 1961)
"Mene, Mene, Tekel, Upharsin" (The New Yorker, April 27, 1963)
"Montraldo" (The New Yorker, June 6, 1964)
"The Geometry of Love" (Saturday Evening Post, January 1, 1966)
"The World of Apples" (Esquire, December 1966)
"Percy" (The New Yorker, September 21, 1968)
"The Fourth Alarm" (Esquire, April 1970)
"Artemis, the Honest Well-Digger" (Playboy, January 1972)
"The Jewels of the Cabots" (Playboy, May 1972)
"Three Stories" [as "Triad"] (Playboy, January 1973)

Reception 
{{ box quote|width=30em|bgcolor=cornsilk|fontsize=100%|salign=center|quote= “The volume contains some very fine stories, particularly ‘The Fourth Alarm’, ‘Percy’, ‘Artemis, the Honest Well Digger and ‘The World of Apples.’ However, none of them is better than the masterpieces which have already been singled out from his earlier volumes. Some are more effectively structured than others, and they differ greatly from one another in subject and style. No particular theme seems to connect a significant number of themes in the collection…as a whole, the volume defies classification and easy analysis, for the stories make a variety of demands on the reader. - Literary critic Lynne Waldeland in John Cheever (1979).}} The World of Apples received outstanding reviews upon its release, and according to biographer Blake Bailey "some of the best reviews of Cheever's career."Meanor, 1995 p. 24: "...the positive critical reception given…The World of Apples..."

Literary critic Lynne Waldeland reports that Larry Woiwode of the New York Times Book Review praised the volume as "an extraordinary book, a transfiguring experience for the reader, and Cheever at his best…"

Biographer Scott Donaldson offers this measured assessment of the collection:

 Footnotes 

 Sources 
Bailey, Blake. 2009 (1). Notes on Text in John Cheever: Collected Stories and Other Writing. The Library of America. Pp. 1025-1028 
Bailey, Blake. 2009 (2). Cheever: A Life. Alfred A. Knopf, New York. 770 pp. 
Donaldson, Scott. 1988. John Cheever: A Biography. Random House, New York. 
Meanor, Patrick. 1995. John Cheever Revisited. Twayne Publishers, New York. 
O'Hara, James E. 1989. John Cheever: A Study of the Short Fiction. Twayne Publishers, Boston Massachusetts. Twayne Studies in Short Fiction no 9.  
Waldeland, Lynne. 1979. John Cheever''. Twayne Publishers, G. K. Hall & Company, Boston, Massachusetts. 

1973 short story collections
American short story collections
Short story collections by John Cheever
Alfred A. Knopf books